TIV MPI Resolution (formerly TIV Mayflower Resolution) is a wind turbine installation vessel deployed to install  turbines at offshore wind farms. It was the first self-elevating Turbine Installation Vessel in the world.

Description
MPI Resolution is a 14,857 GT vessel which has six legs that she can use to raise itself out of the sea when installing offshore wind turbines. Resolution is designed for use in the North Sea, although she can be deployed elsewhere if required. She has the capacity for ten wind turbines at a time. The whole ship can be jacked up out of the sea on her six legs, to provide a stable platform when installing wind turbines. The jacking system uses hydraulics.

MPI Resolution is powered by four ABB AMA4xxLxL diesel generators of  each powering four Aquamaster US 205/3850 azimuth thrusters of  each.

On arrival at the site of the wind turbine, MPI Resolution lowers her six legs to stand on the seabed, and then jacks herself up above the surface of the sea. This provides a stable platform to hammer down a mono-pile into the sea bed and install the wind turbine. When the turbine has been installed, Resolution lowers herself and sails to the next position to repeat the process.

History
Mayflower Resolution was ordered in 2002 by Mayflower Energy Ltd. She was built by Shanhaiguan shipyard, Qinhuangdao, China as yard number TIV 1. She was designed by Dane Knud E Hansen and construction was supervised by Graig Shipping. Mayflower Resolution was built for Mayflower Energy Ltd, part of Mayflower Corporation. Delivery was scheduled for February 2003, but was delayed and the £20,000,000 budget was exceeded by some £10,000,000. The addition of a remotely operated vehicle to lay submarine cables pushed to final bill for her construction to £53,000,000.

Mayflower Resolution was completed in November 2003, and delivered in February 2004. The journey from Qinhuangdao to Falmouth, Cornwall took 66 days. She underwent trials in Falmouth Bay, where she was tested for the first time. Mayflower Resolution was then put to work installing wind turbines at the North Hoyle windfarm for National Wind Power. The contract ended on 23 March and Mayflower Resolution sailed to Middlesbrough, arriving on 30 March. She was due to depart for Great Yarmouth on 8 April to work on installing turbines for the Scroby Sands wind farm. On 31 March, Mayflower Corporation went into administration with debts of £17,700,000. Deloitte Touche were appointed as administrators. Mayflower Resolution was sold by the administrators for £12,000,000 to a group of Mayflower Corporation's managers who managed to get backing from Japanese bank Mizuho International

The new owners became MPI Offshore, based in Stokesley, North Yorkshire. In 2006, MPI Resolution was used in the construction of the Barrow Offshore Wind project for Centrica and DONG Energy. In 2008, Resolution was used in the construction of the Lynn and Inner Dowsing Wind Farm for Centrica. It was announced in July 2008 that two more ships were to be built, based on MPI Resolution but slightly larger. They will be built by Cosco, at their Nantong shipyard. The two new ships will be named MPI Adventure and MPI Discovery. In February 2008, Resolution was sent to Esbjerg, Denmark to work on the installation of a wind farm. In January 2009, Resolution was used in the construction of the Robin Rigg Wind Farm. In 2010, Resolution was employed in the construction of the 100-turbine Thanet wind farm, off the coast of Kent, United Kingdom, sometimes carrying and installing 9 complete turbines.

Resolution also featured in the documentary Mighty Ships, season 2.

Identification
MPI Resolution has the IMO Number 9260134 and callsign PCJM.

See also 
Crane vessel
List of offshore wind farms

References

External links

 MPI Offshore official website
 Current position of MPI Resolution
 2min , from Mighty Ships

Ships built in China
Merchant ships of the Isle of Man
Merchant ships of Cyprus
Wind turbine installation vessels
2003 ships